Besòs is a station of the Barcelona Metro, served by L4 (yellow line). It takes its name from the Besòs neighbourhood of Barcelona (named after the river Besòs), in the Sant Martí district. The station is located in the intersection of Gran Via de les Corts Catalanes, Carretera de Mataró and Rambla de Prim. A connection with the Trambesòs line T5 was introduced in 2006 with the opening of the equally underground tram station.

Services

See also
List of Barcelona Metro stations

External links
Map at TMB.net	
Metro station at Trenscat.com
Tram station at Trenscat.com

Transport in Sant Martí (district)
Trambesòs stops
Barcelona Metro line 4 stations